Ten Little Roosters is an American comedy mystery web series created, directed and written by Josh Flanagan. It premiered on Rooster Teeth's website on November 4, 2014, with a total of 8 episodes. Each episode is uploaded to Rooster Teeth's YouTube channel a day after its release on the Rooster Teeth website. The show featured an interactive murder mystery component and is inspired by Agatha Christie's And Then There Were None. A semi-sequel series, The Eleven Little Roosters, debuted on January 16, 2017.

Format
Creator Josh Flanagan described the series as a "proof of concept" for different, interactive experiences that can be offered by a web series. The series is inspired by Agatha Christie's 1939 novel And Then There Were None. Viewers vote on who they think the murderer is, who they think will die, and how that person will meet their end. Correct guesses were entered for a chance to win Rooster Teeth merchandise, and the fan with the most correct answers upon the completion of the show will win a trip to the Rooster Teeth studios or to a convention of his or her choice.

One party guest is murdered each episode. Both the novel and the series involve the party of ten people being murdered one by one by a mysterious killer, their deaths foreshadowed in the form of a poem. However, the show has a much more comedic tone than the novel. Much of the humour is derived from knowledge of Rooster Teeth itself. For example, characters wear wardrobe from their previous productions (Demarais dons his hobbit costume from A Simple Walk Into Mordor while Haywood wears a kilt akin to his Minecraft avatar). In addition, the story is different so that people familiar with the source material are unable to guess the outcome.

The victim dies within the last few minutes of the episode, their death often being the last few shots. The episode ends with a portrait of the murder victim hanging on a wall and a plaque below the portrait with the specific verse of the poem foreshadowing that character's death.

Plot
The series opens at Rooster Teeth's first company banquet hosted by Burnie Burns for nine of his employees: Chris Demarais, Barbara Dunkelman, Adam Ellis, Gavin Free, Ryan Haywood, Lindsay Jones, Michael Jones, Miles Luna and Gus Sorola. The guests stumble upon a poem entitled Ten Little Roosters, written in the style of the original Ten Little Indians poem. As the evening goes on it becomes clear that the verses of the poem are outlining the murders of several guests over the course of the night, and the guests have no choice but to try and survive locked in with a cold-blooded murderer.

Episodes

References

External links
 

Rooster Teeth
2014 web series debuts
American comedy web series